Alan J. Porter (born October 1959) is a writer of high adventure fiction, pop culture reference books, and comics.

Porter was born in Sale, Greater Manchester, England, and is now a resident of central Texas.

He has written adventures featuring classic characters such as Sherlock Holmes, Allan Quatermain, Houdini, The Three Musketeers, Wild Bill Hickok, and private eye Rick Ruby; as well as his own New Pulp adventurers, The Raven and The Lotus Ronin.

His pop-culture non-fiction work has featured properties such as Batman, Star Trek, The Beatles, G.I. Joe, Battlestar Galactica, and James Bond. he also co-hosts several james Bond related shows on the Her Majesty's Secret Podcast network.

He has also written comics for Tokyopop, BOOM Studios, Marvel, Disney, and Kid Domino as well as several custom corporate and educational comics.

He is also the author of several business books and in 2016 was recognized as one of the Top 25 Content Strategists and a Digital Transformation industry thought leader by CMSWire for whom he also writes a monthly column. He is a regular blogger on various aspects of Customer Experience Management and a regular speaker on the subject at various industry conferences.

External links
Alan J. Porter's Personal Homepage
Bibliography

1959 births
Living people
English bloggers
English comics writers
English writers about music
British male bloggers
People from Sale, Greater Manchester
People educated at William Hulme's Grammar School
Writers from Texas
English expatriates in the United States